Suria (Malay for "Sun") is a Singaporean free-to-air Television channel owned by Mediacorp. The channel broadcasts popular Malay television series, either originally produced by Mediacorp or imported from Malaysia and Indonesia. As of 1 February 2023, its channel logo is based on the corporate Mplifier graphics format, with the word "suria" in yellow placed beside the Mediacorp "M" logo.

History
Plans for a third television channel in Singapore were mooted as far back as January 13, 1972 when the Centre for Production and Training of Adult Education Television (CEPTA TV) suggested that the new channel was to be used to boost adult education. The government said the following day that it had no plans to start the channel.

In August 1983, the SBC set that Channel 12 would broadcast for a period of two to three hours a day, opening at 7pm nightly. Such an arrangement would cause greater flexibility for the SBC to carry live Singapore Symphony Orchestra performances or other features making more use of the evening airtime. The plans were set amidst threats of the launch of a third channel in Malaysia in the middle of 1984. Furthermore, the existing SBC channels would have to move the slots of their newscasts while current affairs programming like Feedback, Friday Background (Channel 5) or the Mandarin Focus (Channel 8) were going to move to the new service, prompting more airtime for local productions.

In December 1983, the SBC announced that Channel 12 would carry 15-minute news bulletins at the end of its nightly schedule. On December 22, the channel's launch was announced for a January 31, 1984 date, and was built upon the pillars of quality (regardless of language) and accessibility (as the service would use the 8-10pm time slots to catch up with the highest possible number of viewers including students unable to stay awake later).

Test broadcasts started on January 15, 1984, showing the test pattern between 9am and 7pm, while regular broadcasts began on 31 January 1984 with cultural programming on its line-up. Expatriates living in Singapore saw mostly-favourable comments about the new service, while still believing that the channel would be improved to a level similar to that of BBC 2 at the time.

The channel aired some sports events such as the Summer and Winter Olympics, Asian Games, SEA Games, Commonwealth Games, FIFA World Cup, UEFA European Championship, European Cup (later renamed the UEFA Champions' League) and the English Premier League.

The channel converted to stereo broadcasts on 1 August 1990.

On 1 January 1994, Channel 12 started airing Malay-language series transferred from Channel 5. On 1 October 1994, the Singaporean Broadcasting Corporation was dissolved and Television Twelve took over the television station. On 1 September 1995, Channel 12 was renamed Prime 12 to match with the launch of its sister channel Premiere 12. Tamil-language programmes from Channel 8 were transferred to Prime 12.

On 30 January 2000, Prime 12 was renamed Suria, becoming a standalone Malay channel as it is today. At the same time, Tamil programmes were transferred to Premiere 12, which was renamed Central.

Suria thus continues the Mediacorp network's long service to Malays in Singapore that began in 1963 with the first Malay TV programmes aired on Channel 5 at the time.

References

See also
 Mediacorp
 Channel 5
 Central
 Okto
 Mediacorp TV12
 TVMobile

2000 establishments in Singapore
Television stations in Singapore
Mass media in Singapore
Mediacorp
Television channels and stations established in 2000
Malay language television stations